Ganden Choeling Nunnery or Geden Chöling is a Tibetan Buddhist vihara for Buddhist nuns in Dharamshala, India. It is near the monastery in which the 14th Dalai Lama resides.

The Gaden Choeling Nunnery was started by nuns who fled from Nechung Ri vihara in Tibet, which was destroyed during the Cultural Revolution. It is the largest and oldest Tibetan nunnery in India. Since most of the nunneries in Tibet are no longer operational, it may be the largest in the world.

Gaden Chöling is built on a steep hillside in Dharamsala. The nunnery is only a ten-minute walk from the main temple in McLeod Ganj. There are 160 nuns in residence.

Gaden Choeling Nunnery in Garzê Tibetan Autonomous Prefecture 
Another nunnery with the same name is located in Garzê Tibetan Autonomous Prefecture (originally Kham, Tibet). Ten bhikṣunis from this monastery were initially involved in the 2008 Tibetan unrest.

Notable nuns
Passang Lhamo

References

External links
Flickr images

Buddhist nunneries
Buildings and structures in Dharamshala
Buddhist monasteries in Himachal Pradesh